The Caproni Ca.309 Ghibli was an Italian aircraft used in World War II. Its nickname 'Ghibli' refers to a desert wind that later served as the inspiration for animation Studio Ghibli's name.

Development
The Caproni Ca.309 was designed by Cesare Pallavicino, based on the Ca.308 Borea transport. It was intended to replace the obsolete IMAM Ro.1 biplane, and to serve as a reconnaissance and ground-attack aircraft.

The Ca.309 was a low-wing cantilever monoplane with a piston engine fitted to each wing.

The aircraft was also produced in Bulgaria. That variant, 24 of which were built, was known as the Kaproni-Bulgarski KB 6/KB 309 Papagal.

Operations

The Ca. 309 served in Libya during the first part of World War II with the Auto-Saharan Company, with good operational results.

After the loss of the African colonies the surviving planes were returned to Italy, where they were used as transports. Two Ghiblis were bought by the Paraguayan government for its Military Air Arm. They were used as transport planes from 1939 to 1945 and in that year they were transferred to Líneas Aéreas de Transporte Nacional (LATN), the Paraguayan first airline which was run by the Military Aviation. They were in active service until the early 1950s and later sold to a private Argentine owner.

Operators
 
 Regia Aeronautica, operated 243 Caproni Ca.309

Italian Air Force
 
 Bulgarian Air Force
 
 Paraguayan Air Arm (two Ca.309)
 Líneas Aéreas de Transporte Nacional (LATN) used two ex-Paraguayan Air Arm Ca.309s

 Norwegian army flying corps

Specifications (Ca.309 production)

See also

References

Bibliography

Ca.309
1930s Italian military reconnaissance aircraft
Aircraft first flown in 1937
Low-wing aircraft
Twin piston-engined tractor aircraft